Jake Stewart may refer to:
 Jake Stewart (politician)
 Jake Stewart (cyclist)